The CLB 75 Tank was a U.S.-produced, prototype armoured fighting vehicle built by C. L. Best's  Traction Company of San Leandro, California. Best was a rival of the Holt Manufacturing Company in producing caterpillar tracked vehicles. Among Best's products was the CLB  'Tracklayer' 
The tank was developed by putting an armoured hull over a CLB 75 sometime between late 1916 and early 1917.

The tank was widely photographed on July 4, 1917 parade in San Francisco. Only a few models were used one of which had a semi-cylindrical hull with a turret and another was similar but the hull had flat surfaces. The tanks trained with the California National Guard.

See also
 Steam powered tracked tank
 Steam Wheel Tank

Bibliography 
Notes

References
 - Total pages: 172  
 - Total pages: 48

External links 

The C L Best Tractor Company Model 75 Tank 

World War I tanks of the United States
Abandoned military projects of the United States
Trial and research tanks of the United States
History of the tank